Irish Hearts is a 1934 British drama film directed by Brian Desmond Hurst and starring Lester Matthews, Nancy Burne and Molly Lamont. It was made at Cricklewood Studios, as a quota quickie. It was also known by the alternative title Norah O'Neale. It was based on Johnson Abrahams's novel Night Nurse.

The film portrays a Doctor, in love with two nurses, who has to confront an epidemic.

Cast
 Lester Matthews as Dermot Fitzgerald  
 Nancy Burne as Norah O'Neale  
 Molly Lamont as Nurse Otway  
 Patric Knowles as Pip Fitzgerald  
 Kyrle Bellew as Matron  
 Torin Thatcher as Dr. Hackey  
 Patrick Barr as Dr. Connellan  
 Sara Allgood as Mrs. Gogarthy  
 Arthur Sinclair as Farmer  
 Joyce Chancellor as Sheila Marr 
 Kathleen Drago as Dublin Mother  
 Maire O'Neill as Mrs. Moriarty  
 Mehan Hartley as Fanninby  
 Tom Collins as Dr. Joyce  
 Pegeen Mair as Ward Nurse 
Mary Warren as Allannah Kenny
 Theresa McCormac as Mrs. Kenny 
 Mary O'Reilly as Nurse Chambers 
 Georgina Leech as Girl 
 Iya Abdy as Casualty Nurse 
 Sean Dempsey    
 Leo Rowsome

References

Bibliography
Wood, Linda. British Films, 1927–1939. British Film Institute, 1986.

External links
 

1934 films
1934 drama films
British drama films
Films directed by Brian Desmond Hurst
Films shot at Cricklewood Studios
Films set in Ireland
British black-and-white films
1930s English-language films
1930s British films